Pambaiyeh (also Romanized as Pambā’īyeh; also known as Mahvā, Mahwa, Pambeh, Pamvā, Pomvāyeh, Pumbeh, and Pūmvā) is a village in Khabar Rural District, Dehaj District, Shahr-e Babak County, Kerman Province, Iran. At the 2006 census, its population was 129, in 25 families.

References 

Populated places in Shahr-e Babak County